Winchester Cathedral Priory was a cathedral monastery attached to Winchester Cathedral, providing the clergy for the church. Cenwealh son of Cynegils is credited with constructing the Old Minster of Winchester in the 640s, and a new bishopric was created in the 660s with Wine as the first bishop. Although attacked by the Vikings in 860 and 879, the monastery survived and recovered.

In 964, during the episcopate of Bishop Æthelwold, the Minster's secular priests were replaced by Benedictine monks from Abingdon Abbey, establishing the cathedral priory. Originally intended for 70 monks, the community declined to 62 monks in 1262 and to 29 in 1495, recovering slightly in the following century, with either 33 or 45 monks when the monastery was dissolved on 15 November 1539.

The priory controlled the Sister Hospital at Winchester, and maintained a school.

The house was originally dedicated to the Holy Trinity, and Saint Peter and Saint Paul. A dedication to Saint Swithun, a 9th-century bishop, was added later.

Notes

References

 

964 establishments
1539 disestablishments in England
Anglo-Saxon monastic houses
Benedictine monasteries in England
Priories in Hampshire
Priory
10th-century establishments in England
Christian monasteries established in the 10th century